"What Kind of a Girl (Do You Think I Am)" is a song written by Loretta Lynn and Teddy Wilburn that was also recorded by Australian country music artist Jean Stafford.

Background and reception 
"What Kind of a Girl (Do You Think I Am)" was recorded at the Bradley's Barn on January 18, 1967. Located in Mount Juliet, Tennessee, the session was produced by renowned country music producer Owen Bradley. Three additional tracks were recorded during this session.

"What Kind of a Girl (Do You Think I Am)" reached number five on the Billboard Hot Country Singles survey in 1967. The song became her eleventh top ten single under the Decca recording label. Secondly, the song became Lynn's first single to chart in Canada. It peaked at number six on the Canadian RPM Country Tracks chart. It was included on her studio album, Fist City (1968).

Track listings 
7" vinyl single
 "What Kind of a Girl (Do You Think I Am)" – 2:49
 "Bargain Basement Dress" – 2:25

Charts

Weekly charts

References 

1967 songs
1967 singles
Decca Records singles
Loretta Lynn songs
Songs written by Loretta Lynn
Song recordings produced by Owen Bradley